Radovan Malević (born 29 May 1957) is a Serbian volleyball player. He competed in the men's tournament at the 1980 Summer Olympics.

References

1957 births
Living people
Serbian men's volleyball players
Olympic volleyball players of Yugoslavia
Volleyball players at the 1980 Summer Olympics
Sportspeople from Valjevo